Benaouda Boudjellal nicknamed Tchengo (died 16 May 2014) was an Algerian footballer who spent most of his career with USM Oran and MC Oran. He is considered one of the greatest strikers of Algeria.

Honours
USM Oran
 Oran League: 1949, 1950
 North African Championship runners-up: 1950
 North African Cup runners-up: 1954

References

2014 deaths
People from Relizane
Association football forwards
Algerian footballers
Footballers from Oran
Algerian Ligue Professionnelle 1 players
USM Oran players
MC Oran players
Year of birth missing
21st-century Algerian people